Poplawski, Popławski or Poplavsky is a Polish surname that may refer to :
 Artur Popławski (1860–1918), a Polish chess master
 Joe Poplawski (1957-), a receiver for the Winnipeg Blue Bombers in the Canadian Football League
 Jan Ludwik Popławski (1854-1908), Polish publicist and politicianKVJJKJ
 Nikodem Popławski (1975-), a Polish theoretical physicist
 Radosław Popławski (1983-), a Polish long-distance runner
 Richard Poplawski (1986-), the perpetrator of the 2009 shooting of Pittsburgh police officers
 Robert Poplawski (1886-1953), a French law professor in Bordeaux, founder of the Law faculty in Pau in 1947
 Stanislav Poplavsky (1902—1973), a general in the Soviet and Polish armies